The 2023 MotoE World Championship (known officially as the 2023 FIM Enel MotoE World Championship for sponsorship reasons) will be the fifth season of the MotoE World Championship for electric motorcycle racing, and will be part of the 75th F.I.M. Grand Prix motorcycle racing season.

Having ran as a World Cup from  until , 2023 will see the start of MotoE having officially gained World Championship status.

Teams and riders 
Ducati will be the sole manufacturer.

Rider changes 
 Dominique Aegerter, the 2022 MotoE World Cup Winner, left MotoE for the Superbike World Championship.
 Álex Escrig left MotoE for the Moto2 World Championship.
 Kevin Manfredi moved from Octo Pramac MotoE to Ongetta Sic58 Squadracorse.

Regulation changes 
The minimum age to participate in MotoE World Championship was raised to 18 years old.

Each race weekend will feature free practice and qualifying on Friday, followed by two races on Saturday.

Calendar 
The following Grands Prix are provisionally scheduled to take place in 2023:

Grand Prix locations

Results and standings

Grands Prix

Riders' standings
Scoring system
Points were awarded to the top fifteen finishers. A rider had to finish the race to earn points.

Notes

References 

MotoE
Grand Prix motorcycle racing seasons
MotoE